Jacoby Glenn (born August 8, 1993) is a former American football cornerback. He was signed by the Chicago Bears as an undrafted free agent in 2015. He played college football at UCF.

Early years
Glenn attended Vigor High School in Prichard, Alabama. He was rated by Rivals.com as a three-star recruit. He originally committed to the University of Kentucky to play college football but changed to the University of Central Florida (UCF).

College career
After redshirting his freshman season in 2012, Glenn started 12 games as a redshirt freshman in 2013, missing one due to injury. He had 52 tackles, two interceptions, and two sacks. As a redshirt sophomore in 2014, Glenn started all 13 games, recording 48 tackles and seven interceptions. He was named the American Athletic Conference's co-Defensive Player of the Year and was also a second-team All-American.

Although he initially intended to stay for his junior season, Glenn entered the 2015 NFL Draft.

Professional career

Chicago Bears
After going undrafted in the 2015 NFL Draft, he signed with the Chicago Bears on May 3, 2016. After being waived on September 5, 2015, he was signed to their practice squad. On November 17, 2015, he was elevated to the active roster. 

On October 2, 2016, Glenn recorded his first interception of his career against Matthew Stafford and the Detroit Lions. On October 25, 2016, Glenn was released by the Bears and was re-signed to the practice squad the next day. He signed a reserve/future contract with the Bears on January 3, 2017. On May 1, 2017, Glenn was waived by the Bears.

Kansas City Chiefs
On August 5, 2017, Glenn signed with the Kansas City Chiefs. He was waived/injured on September 2, 2017 and placed on injured reserve. He was released on October 18, 2017.

References

External links
UCF Knights bio

1993 births
Living people
People from Prichard, Alabama
Players of American football from Alabama
American football cornerbacks
UCF Knights football players
Chicago Bears players
Kansas City Chiefs players